Peekskill High School, established in 1929, is located at 1072 Elm Street in Peekskill, New York, United States. It educates most of the district's ninth, tenth, eleventh, and twelfth graders. The school's current principal is Dr. Jenna Ferris. Peekskill students prepare for the New York State Regents Exams in science, language, mathematics, history and English. In addition to the Regents curriculum, the high school also offers Advanced Placement courses, which prepare students to take the AP Exams offered by the College Board in early May. A new course at the school as of the 2007–2008 school year is the three-year Authentic Science Research program.  Several college courses are also offered.

The school replaced the Peekskill High School at 212 Ringgold Street (1929 to 1972). Prior to 1929, Drum Hill School served as the high school, and is now a senior living community. The current school is located on the former grounds of the original Peekskill Military Academy, which closed in 1968.

Clubs and sports
The school offers many clubs and sports for students to enrich their in-school experiences.

Fall sports:
 Football
 Women's swimming
 Men's and women's cross country
 Men's and women's soccer
 Women's tennis
 Women's volleyball

Winter sports:
 Basketball
 Bowling
 Winter track
 Wrestling
 Men's swimming

Spring sports:
 Baseball
 Softball
 Golf
 Lacrosse
 Men's tennis
 Track

Many students participate in one or more sports, in addition to one or more of the numerous clubs offered year-round.

Clubs offered by the school include:
 Chess Club
 Interact Club
 Latino Culture Club
  Black Culture Club
 Irish Culture Club
 Exchange Club
 Environmental Club
 Ski Club
 Student Council
 S.A.D.D. Club
 Debate Club
 T.V. Club
 Yearbook
 Drama Club

The Drama Club performed the full Broadway score of Rodgers and Hammerstein's The Sound of Music in April 2008.

In 2010 the Drama Club performed Sondheim's Into the Woods.  The show was nominated for eight Metropolitan Theater Awards, including Best Actor and Actress in a Supporting Role, Outstanding Stage Crew, Outstanding Graphic Design, Outstanding Scenic Design, Outstanding Costume Achievement, Outstanding Lobby Display, and Outstanding Instrumentalist.  They won for Outstanding Stage Crew and Outstanding Costume Achievement.

In 2011, under new direction and technical direction, they performed Seussical.  They were only nominated for two Metropolitan Theater Awards, Outstanding Child Actor and Outstanding Graphic Design.

2012 saw the drama club perform ''You're a Good Man, Charlie Brown''.

There are also various honor societies in the school, such as the National Honor Society, Math Honor Society, Mu Alpha Theta, and Science National Honor Society.

Scandal
In January 2013, a scandal was discovered in the guidance department of Peekskill High School.  Four counselors were reassigned as an investigation into the falsifying of transcripts took place.  It was reported that 34 students had been given credits they didn't deserve.  Most were given credit for a "co-op" work experience program that the district had discontinued years earlier.  Superintendent James Willis said in a letter to parents, "The Board of Education and I, along with my administrative team, are absolutely appalled by what we have discovered. This won't be tolerated. Moving forward, I am organizing an internal protocols team to assess the current transcript review processes and to make 
recommendations to ensure something like this can never happen again."  Some students might have to take summer classes or an extra semester in order to graduate on time.

School song
The words of the school song were written in 1932 by Edwin Steckel, music teacher and bandmaster.

Notable faculty and alumni
 Hilton Armstrong, power forward/center for the Washington Wizards
 Reggie Austin, actor
 Elton Brand, power forward for the Atlanta Hawks
 Pidge Browne, professional baseball player
 Derek Dennis, football player
 Jeffrey Deskovic, served a 15-year wrongful imprisonment sentence; exonerated by DNA evidence
 Tre' Johnson, former All-Pro offensive lineman for the Washington Redskins and Cleveland Browns
 Jennifer Jordan, news reporter
 Lou Panzanaro, head coach for the school's basketball team
 George Pataki, former Governor of New York
 Tony Schwartz, advertising pioneer, media visionary and audio documentarian
 Bill Thomas, former NFL player for the Dallas Cowboys, Houston Oilers and Kansas City Chiefs
 Tyler Trewhella, disability activist
 Frank A. Catalina, 1975 graduate, attorney and 22nd Mayor of Peekskill (2014-2017)

References

Educational institutions established in 1972
School buildings completed in 1972
Public high schools in Westchester County, New York
Buildings and structures in Peekskill, New York